Mount Suarez is a mountain, 2,360 m, standing just east of Mount Noville on the divide between Van Reeth and Robison Glaciers, in the Queen Maud Mountains. Mapped by United States Geological Survey (USGS) from surveys and U.S. Navy air photos, 1960–64. Named by Advisory Committee on Antarctic Names (US-ACAN) for LTJG Ralph Suarez, aircraft navigator of U.S. Navy Squadron VX-6 on Operation Deep Freeze 1965, 1966 and 1967.

Mountains of Marie Byrd Land